Gaza Strip Second League is the third tier of the Palestinian Football Association (PFA).

3
Third level football leagues in Asia